Echoes from Ugarit includes original music compositions for piano and orchestra recorded with The Russian Philharmonic Orchestra with Seregey Kondrashev as a conductor, and Andrey Kudryavtsev concertmaster. This is the first arrangement of the oldest music notation in the world. The release of “Echoes from Ugarit” was accompanied by a hugely successful tour of the United States, Europe and the Middle East.

Track listing

Personnel

 Malek Jandali – composer, producer, publisher; piano, orchestration and arrangement
 Sergey Kondrashev – conductor of the Russian Philharmonic Orchestra.
 Pavel Lavrenenkov – recording engineer and sound engineer.
 John Rodd – track mixing, mixing engineer, audio engineer .
 Dave Lawrence – audio engineer and editor.
 Roger Seibel – mastering engineer and sound master.

Charts

Further reading
The Official Website - الموقع الرسمي للموسيقي السوري مالك جندلي
"Arab American News - The first Arab composer to arrange world’s oldest music notation: Syria is the birthplace of alphabet, music and harmony!
"What's On" Magazine - March 2008-  From Ugarit to the World! - Interview With Composer & Pianist Malek Jandali
"Forward Magazine - December 2007 - Syrian Echoes that Reach the World; Malek Jandali Plays Passion on Strings!
"Annahar Newspaper - April 17, 2008 (Arabic) -  عازف البيانو والمؤلف الموسيقي السوري مالك جندلي
"Dubai Jazz - Malek Jandali: A Truly Hidden Syrian Gem!
"The Center for Arab Culture and Dialogue - Washington D.C.-  Syrian Musician Arranges and Performs World's Oldest Music Notation.
"www.US4Arabs.com - First Arab composer to arrange world’s oldest music from Syria!
"Asdaa Newspaper - Press Release (Arabic) - Montréal Canada - May 2008
"Arab News - Press Release - Middle East - May 27, 2008
"Cham Press - Article (Arabic) - مالك جندلي يحاول أن يعلم الأمريكيين ثراء الثقافة العربية ويؤكد عظمة الموسيقى السورية القديمة
"Ministry of Culture - Press Release (Arabic) - Damascus, Syria

References

http://www.1888pressrelease.com/malek-jandali-composer-pianist-is-releasing-his-most-rec-pr-1d6k0do94.html

External links
 The official website of Malek Jandali
 From Ugarit to the World!

2009 albums
World music albums by Syrian artists
Ugarit in popular culture